Stay Free may refer to:

 Stay Free (The Sound of Arrows album), 2017 album by The Sound of Arrows
 Stay Free!, a magazine about the politics of culture
 Stayfree (feminine hygiene), a brand of feminine hygiene products
 "Stay Free", a song by The Clash from Give 'Em Enough Rope

See also
 Free to Stay, 2004 LP by Smoosh